Powiat tomaszowski may refer to two counties (powiats) in Poland:
Tomaszów Lubelski County, in Lublin Voivodeship (east Poland)
Tomaszów Mazowiecki County, in Łódź Voivodeship (central Poland)